A Couple of Down and Outs is a 1923 British silent drama film directed by Walter Summers and starring Edna Best, Rex Davis and George Foley.

Production
It was made at Isleworth Studios. The film sought to raise public sympathy for veterans of the First World War struggling in the years of peace as well as animals who had undergone war service. Summers, who had himself served during the conflict, made a number of films using the war as backdrop.

Synopsis
Danny Creath, an unemployed war veteran, is passing through the docks when sees his old horse 'Jack' being maltreated before it is shipped to Belgium to be turned into horsemeat. They had previously served together in the Royal Horse Artillery, both being wounded in action, and Creath decides to rescue him with the assistance of crowd of passers-by. Pursued by the police he takes shelter in a house where a young woman, reminded of her own brother who was killed during the war, helps him to escape.

Cast
 Edna Best as Molly Roarke  
 Rex Davis as Danny Creath  
 George Foley as P.C. Roake  
 Philip Hewland

References

Bibliography
 Harris, Ed. Britain's Forgotten Film Factory: The Story of Isleworth Studios. Amberley Publishing, 2013.

External links

1923 films
1920s war drama films
British war drama films
British silent feature films
1920s English-language films
Films directed by Walter Summers
Films shot at Isleworth Studios
Films set in England
Films set in London
British World War I films
British black-and-white films
1923 drama films
1920s British films
Silent war drama films